Spiritsville is the second album led by American jazz trombonist Julian Priester which was recorded in 1960 for Riverside's subsidiary Jazzland label.

Reception

The Allmusic site awarded the album 3 stars.

Track listing
All compositions by Julian Priester except as indicated
 "Chi-Chi" (Charlie Parker) - 4:43   
 "Blue Stride" - 6:15 
 "It Might as Well Be Spring" (Richard Rodgers, Oscar Hammerstein II) - 5:47  
 "Excursion" (Walter Benton) - 5:42   
 "Spiritsville" - 7:31  
 "My Romance" (Rodgers, Lorenz Hart) - 5:50  
 "Donna's Waltz" - 5:32

Personnel 
Julian Priester - trombone
Walter Benton - tenor saxophone (tracks 1, 2 & 4-7)
Charles Davis - baritone saxophone (tracks 1, 2 & 4-7)
McCoy Tyner - piano 
Sam Jones - bass
Art Taylor - drums

References 

1960 albums
Julian Priester albums
Jazzland Records (1960) albums
Albums produced by Orrin Keepnews